Magyarvalkó is the Hungarian name for two places in Romania:

 Văleni village, Călățele Commune, Cluj County
 Valcău de Jos Commune, Sălaj County (until 1899; subsequently called Alsóvalkó)